Brachybacterium phenoliresistens is a species of Gram positive,  facultatively anaerobic, yellow-pigmented bacterium. The cells are coccoid during the stationary phase, and irregular rods during the exponential phase. It was first isolated from oil-contaminated sand in Pingtung County, Taiwan. The species was first described in 2007, and its name refers to the species' ability to resist phenol. It is most closely related to B. nesterenkovii.

The optimum pH is 7.0, and it can grow at pH 5.0-10.0.

References

Micrococcales
Bacteria described in 2007